São José do Vale do Rio Preto is a municipality located in the Brazilian state of Rio de Janeiro. Its population was 21,916 (2020) and its area is 240 km2.

The municipality contains the  Pedra das Flores Natural Monument, created in 2005.
It contains the  Maravilha Environmental Protection Area and the  Araponga Municipal Nature Park, both created in 2006.
It is part of the Central Rio de Janeiro Atlantic Forest Mosaic of conservation units, created in 2006.

References

Municipalities in Rio de Janeiro (state)